Helluodema is a genus of beetles in the family Carabidae, containing the following species:

 Helluodema brunneum Sloane, 1917
 Helluodema unicolor (Hope, 1842)

References

Anthiinae (beetle)